Harrison House may refer to:

Canada
Harrison House (Fredericton), a university residence at the University of New Brunswick, Fredericton, New Brunswick, Canada

United States 
(by state then city)

Sen. James A. Harrison House, Nogales, Arizona, listed on the National Register of Historic Places (NRHP) in Santa Cruz County, Arizona
Harrison House (San Juan Capistrano, California), listed on the NRHP in Orange County, California
Thomas Harrison House (Branford, Connecticut), NRHP-listed
Harrison-Gibson House, Columbus, Georgia, listed on the NRHP in Muscogee County, Georgia
William G. Harrison House, Nashville, Georgia, NRHP-listed
Benjamin Harrison House, Indianapolis, Indiana, NRHP-listed
Grouseland, William Henry Harrison Home, Vincennes, Indiana, a U.S. National Historic Landmark
E. H. Harrison House, Keokuk, Iowa, NRHP-listed
Fannie Harrison Farm, Elizabethtown, Kentucky, listed on the NRHP in Hardin County, Kentucky
C. Lewis Harrison House, Newton, Massachusetts, NRHP-listed
Samuel Harrison House, Pittsfield, Massachusetts, NRHP-listed
Harrison House (Fayette, Mississippi), a museum in Mississippi
William Henry and Lilla Luce Harrison House, Cape Girardeau, Missouri, listed on the NRHP in Cape Girardeau County, Missouri
Harrison Lake Patrol Cabin, Glacier National Park, Montana, listed on the NRHP in Flathead County, Montana
Waborn (Wabe) and Sarah E. Harrison Ranch House, Greycliff, Montana, listed on the NRHP in Sweet Grass County, Montana
Samuel Orton Harrison House, West Caldwell, New Jersey, NRHP-listed
Edward Harrison House, Brockport, New York, listed on the NRHP in Monroe County, New York
The Manor (Glen Cove, New York), formerly known as "Harrison House"
Harrison Meeting House Site and Cemetery, Montgomery, New York, NRHP-listed
Wallace K. Harrison Estate, West Hills, New York, NRHP-listed
Gen. William Henry Harrison Headquarters, Columbus, Ohio, listed on the NRHP in Columbus, Ohio
Harrison-Landers House, Newtown, Ohio, NRHP-listed
Harrison House (Centerville, Pennsylvania), NRHP-listed
Harrison House (Franklin, Tennessee), listed on the NRHP in Williamson County, Tennessee
Harrison-Hastedt House, Columbus, Texas, listed on the NRHP in Colorado County, Texas
John S. Harrison House, Selma, Texas, listed on the NRHP in Bexar County, Texas
Gerard A. Harrison House, Wharton, Texas, listed on the NRHP in Wharton County, Texas
Harrison-Dennis House, Wharton, Texas, listed on the NRHP in Wharton County, Texas
Wood-Harrison House, Springville, Utah, NRHP-listed
Daniel Harrison House, Dayton, Virginia, NRHP-listed
Thomas Harrison House (Harrisonburg, Virginia), NRHP-listed

See also
Thomas Harrison House (disambiguation)
Harrison Building (disambiguation)